Matevž Kos (born 1966) is a Slovene literary historian and essayist.

Kos was born in Ljubljana in 1966. He studied Comparative literature, Literary theory and Philosophy at the University of Ljubljana and works primarily as a literary critic and essayist and lecturer at the University of Ljubljana. He was head of the Jury for the Kresnik Award between 2004 and 2007. In 1997 he received the Rožanc Award for his book of literary essays Prevzetnost in pristranost (Pride and Prejudice).

Published works

 Prevzetnost in pristranost : literarni spisi (Pride and Prejudice: Literary Essays), 1996
 Kritike in refleksije (Critiques and Reflections), 2000
 Poskusi z Nietzschejem : Nietzsche in ničejanstvo v slovenski literaturi (Experiments with Nietzsche: Nietzsche and Nietzschism in Slovene Literature), 2003
 Branje po izbiri (Reading by Choice), 2004
 Fragmenti o celoti: poskusi s slovenskim pesništvom (Fragments about a Whole: Experiments with Slovene Poetry), 2007

References

Slovenian literary historians
Slovenian essayists
Living people
1966 births
University of Ljubljana alumni
Academic staff of the University of Ljubljana